6 Lyncis is a star in the northern constellation of Lynx, located approximately 179 light years from Earth. It is visible to the naked eye as a dim, orange-hued star with an apparent visual magnitude of 5.86. This object is moving away from the Earth with a heliocentric radial velocity of +40 km/s. It has a relatively high proper motion, traversing the celestial sphere at the rate of 0.341 arc seconds per annum.

At the age of 2.8 billion years old, it has exhausted the hydrogen at its core, causing it to evolve away from the main sequence. As a consequence, it has expanded to 5.2 times the radius of the Sun although it only has 1.46 times the Sun's mass. The star is radiating 14.9 times the luminosity of the Sun from its swollen photosphere at an effective temperature of 4,994 K. One sub-stellar companion has been identified.

Planetary system
In July 2008, the planet 6 Lyncis b was announced by Bun'ei Sato and collaborators from the Okayama Planet Search Program, along with 14 Andromedae b and 81 Ceti b. The planet was found to have minimum mass of 2.4 Jupiter masses and period of 899 days.

See also
 14 Andromedae
 81 Ceti
 HD 167042
 Lists of exoplanets

References

External links
 

K-type giants
Planetary systems with one confirmed planet
Lynx (constellation)
Durchmusterung objects
Lyncis, 06
045410
031039
2331